Dr. Rick is a fictional character appearing in advertisements for Progressive Corporation insurance. The character, portrayed by Bill Glass, is a self-help coach who helps new homeowners keep from "turning into" their parents.

Concept and creation
In 2015, the chief marketing officer of Progressive Corporation, Jeff Charney, began searching for ideas for a new advertising campaign that would revolve around the "stages of life". Charney eventually decided to use the idea of parental introjection. After consulting with psychologists, Charney and his team found that people tend to experience this phenomenon after buying their first home.

Initially, Arnold Worldwide created a series of advertisements that revolved around "parentamorphosis", a portmanteau of "parent" and "metamorphosis". The advertising firm created Dr. Rick for a 2017 "parentamorphosis" advertisement where he was identified as "Rick". The campaign soon evolved to feature Dr. Rick as its central character.

Appearances
 Dr. Rick, who is portrayed by actor Bill Glass, has appeared in six commercials for Progressive.

In 2021, Progressive released a book titled Dr. Rick Will See You Now. The book, which was advertised as being authored by Dr. Rick, is a comedic guide containing the character's teachings. Progressive has published five thousand copies of the 119-page book.

Reception
According to a 2022 poll by Ad Age and The Harris Poll, Dr. Rick has a 59% favorability rating and a 54% awareness rating, making him the seventh-most popular insurance advertisement character in the United States.

The Dr. Rick commercials have received praise for their relatability. Barbara Mellers, a marketing and psychology professor at the University of Pennsylvania, also noted that the campaign's simplicity and surprise factor are what makes the character successful: "I think we all experience it, but I don’t know how much has been written on it or how broad a topic it is in the general conversation of life." According to Ad Age, viewers respond well to the character's dry humor.

References 

Male characters in advertising
Progressive Corporation